This article is team squads of 2012 Hassanal Bolkiah Trophy. Each nation must submit a squad of 20 players, 17 of which must be born on or after 1 January 1991, and 3 of which can be older dispensation players, by 17 February 2012. A minimum of two goalkeepers (plus one optional dispensation goalkeeper) must be included in the squad.

Group A

Indonesia

Head coach:  Widodo C Putro

Laos

Head coach:  Han Hong-il

1 Wildcard players

Myanmar

Head coach: 

1 Wildcard players

Philippines

Head coach:  Zoran Đorđević

1 Wildcard players

Singapore

Head coach:  Robin Chitrakar

1 Wildcard players

Group B

Brunei

Head coach:  Kwon Oh-son

1 Wildcard players

Cambodia

Head coach:  Lee Tae-hoon

1 Wildcard players

Malaysia

Head coach:  Ismail Ibrahim

Timor-Leste

Head coach:  Almerio Isaac

1 Wildcard players

Vietnam

Head coach:  Mai Đức Chung

1wildcard player

References

External links
 Official Website

squads
2012